Aaron Wheatley is an Australian former professional rugby league footballer who played in the 2000s for Canterbury-Bankstown and St George Illawarra.

Early life
Wheatley began playing junior rugby league with West Wyalong Mallee Men.

Playing career
Wheatley played for Canterbury in 2007.  Wheatley had previously played for St George in 2004.

References

External links
Dragons profile

1981 births
St. George Illawarra Dragons players
Canterbury-Bankstown Bulldogs players
Newtown Jets NSW Cup players
Rugby league second-rows
Living people
Australian rugby league players
Rugby league players from New South Wales